Lenox is a town in Cook County, Georgia, United States. The population was 752 at the 2020 census.

History
Lenox was platted in 1888, when the railroad was extended to that point. According to tradition, the town was named after a certain "lean ox". The Georgia General Assembly incorporated the town in 1901.

Geography

Lenox is located in northern Cook County at  (31.2712, -83.4654). U.S. Route 41 passes through the center of the town as Robinson Street, and Interstate 75 passes through the west side of the town, with access from Exit 49.

Demographics

2020 census

As of the 2020 United States census, there were 752 people, 333 households, and 194 families residing in the town.

2000 census
As of the census of 2010, there were 889 people, 351 households, and 237 families residing in the town. The racial makeup of the town was 58.61% White, 38.02% African American, 0.22% Native American, 2.36% from other races, and 0.79% from two or more races. Hispanic or Latino of any race were 2.81% of the population.

There were 351 households, out of which 27.9% had children under the age of 18 living with them, 47.3% were married couples living together, 15.4% had a female householder with no husband present, and 32.2% were non-families. 29.9% of all households were made up of individuals, and 14.8% had someone living alone who was 65 years of age or older.  The average household size was 2.53 and the average family size was 3.13.

In the town, the population was spread out, with 26.2% under the age of 18, 8.7% from 18 to 24, 22.7% from 25 to 44, 27.1% from 45 to 64, and 15.3% who were 65 years of age or older.  The median age was 39 years. For every 100 females, there were 90.8 males.  For every 100 females age 18 and over, there were 88.0 males.

The median income for a household in the town was $18,681, and the median income for a family was $26,528. Males had a median income of $24,375 versus $18,523 for females. The per capita income for the town was $12,144.  About 22.8% of families and 27.7% of the population were below the poverty line, including 36.1% of those under age 18 and 26.1% of those age 65 or over.

Festivities

Lenox is the home of the Lean-Ox Festival, the oldest festival in Cook County. It is held the third weekend of November every year.

References

Towns in Cook County, Georgia
Towns in Georgia (U.S. state)